Kamiko is an action video game developed by Skipmore and published by Flyhigh Works for the Nintendo Switch and released on April 13, 2017 in Japan and on April 27, 2017 in North America, Europe and Australasia. The game was released on Steam on June 26, 2019 and June 27, 2019 for the PS4 in Japan. The game received mixed to good reviews according to critics.

Gameplay 

Kamiko is an action game.

Synopsis

Development and release 

Kamiko was developed by Skipmore and published by Flyhigh Works.

Reception 

According to review aggregator site Metacritic, Kamiko received "mixed or average" reviews on Switch. According to Circle Entertainment CEO Chris Chau, Kamiko had sold over 110,000 times by July 2017 on the Nintendo Switch. In April 2018, Flyhigh Works announced that the game had sold over 200,000 copies on the Switch. As of June 2019, the title has sold over 250,000 copies on Switch. 

Nintendo Lifes Morgan Sleeper stated that the game "Nails the feeling of general progression" while praising the gameplay as making up for what little the game has to offer. He also enjoyed the fact that the three playable characters lent "an entirely different flow" to the game which "helped extend the replay value of what is otherwise a very brief experience". Nintendo World Reports Daan Koopman called the game's retro aesthetic "lovely" and its flow "grand". He also noted the games "slower moments" that "never really" dragged the game down. Koopman also disliked the shortness of Kamiko, but felt that it "absolutely owns up" to its brief length.

References 

2017 video games
Action video games
Flyhigh Works games
Nintendo Switch games
PlayStation 4 games
Shinto in fiction
Single-player video games
Video games developed in Japan
Windows games